The 1984–85 season was Sport Lisboa e Benfica's 81st season in existence and the club's 51st consecutive season in the top flight of Portuguese football, covering the period from 1 July 1984 to 30 June 1985. Benfica competed domestically in the Primeira Divisão, Taça de Portugal and the Supertaça Cândido de Oliveira, and participated in the European Cup after winning the previous league.

In the off-season, Sven-Göran Eriksson left for Roma and Benfica hired Tomislav Ivic. Major departures included Fernando Chalana and Glenn Strömberg. To counter, the club added Jorge Silva, Wando and Adelino Nunes. Even before the end of the season, Ivic resigned and Benfica was forced to replace him in August. The selected was Pál Csernai. 
Benfica never performed as expected and even suffered their longest ever win-less period in the Primeira Divisão. In the end, the team ended in third place, 12 points from first place, and lost the Supertaça Cândido de Oliveira. Still, it was not a trophy-less season as Benfica conquered their 19th Taça de Portugal in a 3–1 win against Porto.

Season summary
Benfica entered the new season as defending Champions, but with significant changes. After two years in Portugal, Sven-Göran Eriksson was hired by Roma. Same of the names speculated as replacement were Georges Heylens, John Mortimore and Gilbert Gress. The new manager was announced on 6 July, Croatian Tomislav Ivic. In the transfer season, Benfica lost two major players, Fernando Chalana and Glenn Strömberg. To replace him, Benfica signed domestic players like Jorge Silva, Wando and Adelino Nunes. The club also approached Torbjörn Nilsson, Washington and Walter Casagrande, but nothing came out of it. The pre-season began on 19 July, with games scheduled with Bordeaux on late July, the Lisbon International Tournament in August, and the presentation game with Vasco da Gama after that.
After just one game in charge, on 31 July, Tomislav Ivic resigned because he wanted to get paid in dollars. The position was offered to assistant manager Toni but he declined it for unspecified reasons. On 9 August, Benfica selected Pál Csernai as Ivic's replacement.

The league campaign started in the best of ways, with two wins, but on match-day 3, Benfica lost in the Clássico with Porto. In October, Benfica began their European Cup campaign with Crvena Zvezda, defeating them on aggregate. In the second round, Benfica met Liverpool and were eliminated. Now fully focused on the league campaign, Benfica lost in the Derby de Lisboa in late December and got delayed in the battle to retain his league title. There were now 6 points shy of leaders Porto. On 20 January, Benfica drew with Braga on match-day 17 and started their biggest ever win-less period in the Primeira Divisão. They would spend two and half months without winning in the league, with six draws and one loss. Despite that, a Taça de Portugal campaign involving only second tier teams allowed the team to progress through the rounds with ease.

The team eventually resettled and won all league matches in April. In the Supertaça Cândido de Oliveira, a one-nil win for both Benfica and Porto forced a replay of the competition. In early May, John Mortimore was confirmed as new manager, with Csernai still in charge for another month. Before the end of May, Benfica lost away in the first leg of the Supertaça to Porto, but won the Derby de Lisboa with Sporting by 3–1, reducing the distance between them. In June, Benfica lost again in the Supertaça, losing the competition and finished the league in third place, 12 points behind Porto and five from Sporting. The season finished with the Taça de Portugal Final against Porto, with Benfica winning 3–1. It was their 19th Taça de Portugal win in 25 Finals, their seventh in eight against Porto. After the win, Manuel Bento sent a jab to Csernai: "It was not Csernai who made the line up, that's why we won. It was Carlos Manuel and Minervino Pietra who opened his eyes."

Competitions

Overall record

Supertaça Cândido de Oliveira

Primeira Divisão

League table

Results by round

Matches

Taça de Portugal

European Cup

First round

Second round

Friendlies

Player statistics
The squad for the season consisted of the players listed in the tables below, as well as staff member Pál Csernai (manager), Toni (assistant manager), Eusébio assistant manager), Júlio Borges (Director of Football), Amilcar Miranda (Doctor).

Transfers

In

Out

Out by loan

Notes

References

Bibliography
 
 
 
 

S.L. Benfica seasons
Benfica